Superdiamagnetism (or perfect diamagnetism) is a phenomenon occurring in certain materials at low temperatures, characterised by the complete absence of magnetic permeability (i.e. a volume magnetic susceptibility  = −1) and the exclusion of the interior magnetic field.

Superdiamagnetism established that the superconductivity of a material was a stage of phase transition. Superconducting magnetic levitation is due to superdiamagnetism, which repels a permanent magnet which approaches the superconductor, and flux pinning, which prevents the magnet floating away.

Superdiamagnetism is a feature of superconductivity. It was identified in 1933, by Walther Meissner and Robert Ochsenfeld, but it is considered distinct from the Meissner effect which occurs when the superconductivity first forms, and involves the exclusion of magnetic fields that already penetrate the object.

Theory

Fritz London and Heinz London developed the theory that the exclusion of magnetic flux is brought about by electrical screening currents that flow at the surface of the superconducting material and which generate a magnetic field that exactly cancels the externally applied field inside the superconductor.  These screening currents are generated whenever a superconducting material is brought inside a magnetic field.  This can be understood by the fact that a superconductor has zero electrical resistance, so that eddy currents, induced by the motion of the material inside a magnetic field, will not decay.  Fritz, at the Royal Society in 1935, stated that the thermodynamic state would be described by a single wave function.

"Screening currents" also appear in a situation wherein an initially normal, conducting metal is placed inside a magnetic field.  As soon as the metal is cooled below the appropriate transition temperature, it becomes superconducting.  This expulsion of magnetic field upon the cooling of the metal cannot be explained any longer by merely assuming zero resistance and is called the Meissner effect. It shows that the superconducting state does not depend on the history of preparation, only upon the present values of temperature, pressure and magnetic field, and therefore is a true thermodynamic state.

See also
 Superfluidity
 Timeline of low-temperature technology

References
 Shachtman, Tom, Absolute Zero: And the Conquest of Cold. Houghton Mifflin Company,  December 1999. 

Magnetic levitation
Superconductivity